Paradichelia coenographa is a species of moth of the family Tortricidae. It is found in Papua New Guinea.

The larvae feed on Camellia sinensis, Colocasia esculenta, Coffea and Lantana species.

References

	

Moths described in 1938
Archipini